Last Resort is a British drama film directed by Paweł Pawlikowski in his feature directorial debut. Starring Dina Korzun, Artyom Strelnikov and Paddy Considine, the film concerns a Russian immigrant and her son who become stranded in a small English seaside town when her British fiancé does not show up as planned. 

The film had its world premiere at the Edinburgh International Film Festival on 22 August 2000 and played at various film festivals to critical acclaim. Pawlikowski won a BAFTA Award for Most Promising Newcomer and the FIRESCI Prize at the London Film Festival.

Plot
Tanya, a young Russian woman, arrives with her 10-year-old son Artyom in London, expecting to be met by her fiancé Mark. When he does not arrive, Tanya panics and claims political asylum, resulting in her and her son being confined to the small seaside town of Stonehaven while their claim is considered, a process she is told could take up to a year. Stonehaven, a former resort town, has been converted into a ''designated holding area'' for undocumented immigrants. Tanya and Artyom are placed in a shabby apartment building that overlooks an abandoned amusement park. The area is patrolled by officers who make sure that refugees don't escape. Tanya, who illustrated children's books in Russia, carries a framed illustration she made amongst her belongings.

Tanya is propositioned by Les, an Internet pornographer, to participate in webcam porn videos. Though Tanya is initially wary of the idea, she decides to take up Les' offer when she is desperate for money. As she dresses up in one of the costumes Les gives her and crawls onto the bed, she starts crying and cannot follow through with the video, ultimately leaving. She finds other ways of making money, such as donating blood. Using the holding area's one operating payphone, she is finally able to make contact with Mark, but he breaks up with her. 

Tanya attempts to withdraw her claim for asylum and tells the council officers she wants to go back to Russia, but she is told the review of her petition could still take months. Alfie, a former boxer who manages the local amusement arcade, takes sympathy in Tanya's plight, helping her with using the phone line and bringing necessities for her and Artyom. Artyom bonds with Alfie and the two repaint the drab flat he shares with his mother. Though Tanya does not want to get her heart broken again, she enters into a relationship with Alfie. Alfie reveals how he came to end up in Stonehaven; after doing prison time for a fight he got into, he felt he had nothing else to go back to, saying the town is full of "fuckups" like him. Tanya gets choked up when she admits that she's been married and divorced twice previously, crying that it is bad for her and Artyom, but Alfie comforts her. Artyom soon falls in with a group of tough kids who drink, smoke, and engage in petty theft. One day, Les goes to see Tanya at her flat and pays her for the first video attempt, promising more money if she returns and completes the video. Alfie hears through the door and inquires about what business Les is seeking with Tanya, but she denies any involvement. 

Later, Alfie angrily walks into Les' home and interrupts a webcam video he is filming, destroying his camera and the furniture. Alfie comes to get Tanya and Artyom, saying he is going to get them out of Stonehaven. The three of them hide in a small, abandoned sailboat on the beach; when the water rises, they sail away and manage to evade the security guards. Alfie, as well as Artyom, want Tanya to stay in England, but she reasons she has to go back to start a new life. Alfie finds a truck for Tanya and Artyom that will take them to the airport. After embracing, Tanya and Alfie say they'll remember each other. Tanya leaves Alfie with the framed illustration as a gift.

Cast

Production
Margate, in Thanet Kent, doubled as the fictional seaside town of Stonehaven, and was the setting for the majority of the film.

Reception

Critical response 
The film was met with widespread critical acclaim. On review aggregate site Rotten Tomatoes, the film has a "Certified Fresh" approval rating of 94% based on 70 critics' reviews. The site's consensus reads, "Critics are raving about Last Resort, saying it's a convincing, touching tale. Particularly impressive is the lack of script during the film's shoot." On Metacritic, the film has a score of 80 based on 21 reviews, indicating "generally favorable reviews".

A.O. Scott of The New York Times wrote though the story "dwells on sorrowful circumstances and illuminates a grim corner of contemporary reality, [the film] is far from depressing. Mr. Pawlikowski, most of whose previous films have been documentaries, balances the harsh naturalism his story demands with an almost romantic sense of visual beauty." He added "the thoughtful stylishness of Mr. Pawlikowski's direction doesn't cheapen or aestheticize Tanya's plight but rather extends to her the dignity and compassion that only art can confer." Scott also singled out Paddy Considine's performance, saying it "gives the film a comic spark and a glow of warmth. Alfie's casual cynicism and underlying decency slowly break down Tanya's defenses, and the audience's, too." 

Roger Ebert gave the film 3/4 stars and commented, "Dina Korzun's performance holds our interest because she bases every scene on the fact that her character is a stranger in a strange land with no money and a son to protect." He commended the ending, noting "how it concludes its emotional journey without pretending the underlying story is over."

Kenneth Turan of the Los Angeles Times described the film as "Spare yet unsparing, emotionally affecting without even a hint of excess, it’s an honest, haunting look at the connection between a pair of lonely people who wonder where they belong."

Awards 

 BAFTA Awards
 Most Promising Newcomer (Pawel Pawlikowski)
 Bratislava International Film Festival
 Best Actress (Dina Korzun)
 Edinburgh International Film Festival
 Best New British Feature
 Gijón International Film Festival 
 Best Actress (Dina Korzun)
 Best Feature (Pawel Pawlikowski)
 London Film Festival
 FIPRESCI Prize - Special Mention
 Thessaloniki Film Festival
 Best Actor (Paddy Considine)
 Best Actress (Dina Korzun)
 FIRESCI Prize - International Competition (Pawel Pawlikowski)
 Golden Alexander Award (Pawel Pawlikowski)

References

External links

 

2000 films
2000 independent films
2000 drama films
British drama films
Films directed by Paweł Pawlikowski
2000 directorial debut films
Films shot in Kent
Films about immigration to Europe
2000s British films